Hugh Lowther may refer to:
 Hugh Lowther, 5th Earl of Lonsdale (1857 – 1944)
 Hugh Lowther, 8th Earl of Lonsdale (born 1949)